The 2016–17 season of the Oberliga was the ninth season of the Oberligas at tier five of the German football league system and the 43nd season overall since reintroduction of the Oberligas in 1974.

The Oberliga is organised in fourteen regional divisions with the league champions promoted to the level above, the Regionalligas while the relegated teams drop down to the Verbandsligas and Landesligas.

Overview

In the 2016–17 season 241 clubs competed in the Oberligas.

Nine of the league champions earned direct promotion to the Regionalligas, SC Freiburg II, VfB Eichstätt, SSV Jeddeloh, FC Wegberg-Beeck, VSG Altglienicke, BSG Chemie Leipzig, KFC Uerdingen, TSV Schott Mainz and TuS Erndtebrück, while the Oberliga Westfalen runners-up, Westfalia Rhynern, Bayernliga Süd runners-up, FC Unterföhring and Hessenliga runners-up, Eintracht Stadtallendorf were also directly promoted. The latter two respectively replaced SV Pullach and SC Hessen Dreieich who declined promotion. In Northern Germany Bremer SV, Eintracht Northeim, Altona 93 and Eutin 08 competed for two more Regionalliga Nord places in a play-off, which Altona and Eutin won, while Röchling Völklingen, FSV Bissingen and Rot-Weiss Frankfurt did the same for the Regionalliga Südwest, with Völklingen earning promotion. Of the 49 clubs leaving the Oberliga 42 were relegated while 7 withdrew from the leagues.

2016–17 season
The 2016–17 league champions, promoted and relegated teams, the league strength (S), the top scorer and the number of goals they scored, as far as has been determined:

 ‡ Denotes club declined promotion.
 † Denotes club withdrew from league.
 ¶ Denotes club failed to win promotion.
 # Denotes club was ineligible for promotion.

Promotion play-offs
For three of the five Regionalligas promotion play-offs were held for qualified Oberliga teams. The other two Regionalligas, Nordost and West, did not hold play-off rounds, instead they operated with direct promotion only.

Regionalliga Bayern
The 15th and 16th placed Regionalliga teams, SpVgg Greuther Fürth II and SV Seligenporten, played the runners-up of the northern division and the third-placed team of the southern division. The winners of these games qualified for the 2016–17 Regionalliga, the losers played each other for one more spot in the Regionalliga after SpVgg Unterhaching was successful in winning promotion to the 3. Liga. The teams that qualified were runners-up Viktoria Aschaffenburg in the north and third-placed FC Pipinsried in the south as southern champions SV Pullach did not apply for a Regionalliga licence and runners-up FC Unterföhring were promoted.
Round one

|}
Round two

|}

Regionalliga Nord
Promotion play-offs were to be held at the end of the season to the Regionalliga Nord. The runners-up of the Niedersachsenliga and the champions or, in Hamburg's case, the best-placed team with a licence, of the Bremen-Liga, Oberliga Hamburg and Schleswig-Holstein-Liga played each other for two more spots in the Regionalliga. In the promotion round each team met the other just once with the two highest-placed teams in the final table promoted, however the final two matches were deemed obsolete and played as friendly matches because the two promoted teams had already been determined.

Regionalliga Südwest
The runners-up of the Hessenliga, Oberliga Baden-Württemberg and Oberliga Rheinland-Pfalz/Saar competed for one more spot in the Regionalliga Südwest, with each team playing the other just once.

References

External links
 Fussball.de  Official results website of the German Football Association
 Weltfussball.de  German football results and tables
 Scoresway.com Oberliga tables and results

 
5
Germ